Taikisha Global Limited, commonly known as Taikisha or TKS, is a Japanese multinational corporation headquartered in Tokyo, Japan, that designs, fabricates, installs, and commissions large-scale heating, ventilation, and air conditioning (HVAC) systems for large infrastructures and industrial process equipment.

History

The company was founded in 1913 by Uenishi. In 1952, the paint plant business begins. In 1971, Taikisha established a new office in Bangkok, Thailand. Then in 1974, it was listed on the Tokyo Stock Exchange.

Taikisha  founded TKS Industrial Company in the United States in 1981, Taikisha Canada in 1985, Taikisha España in 1987, Taikisha United Kingdom Ltd and Malaysia Kuala Lumpur Engineering in 1989, Taikisha Indonesia Engineering and Taikisha de Mexico SA de CV in 1990, Taikisha Korea in 1991, Goshu Process Co. Ltd (China) in 1994, Taikisha Engineering India, Philippines and Vietnam in 1995, Taikisha Brazil in 1996, Hong Kong in 2000. In 2004, the group founded Tianjin Azuma Tsubaki (paint transport system equipment) in China.

In 2007, Taikisha reorganized into two divisions: Paint Systems division and Environmental Systems division. In 2011, Taikisha Paint division globally partnered with Geico Paint Systems, headquartered in Italy. In 2015, Taikisha U.S. - TKS Industrial acquired Encore Automation.

Activities 

Taikisha Global is divided into two core business units:

 Green Technology
 Paint Finishing

Taikisha Global has corporate offices in 24 countries.

References

External links
 Official website

Companies based in Tokyo
Engineering companies of Japan
Heating, ventilation, and air conditioning companies
Multinational companies headquartered in Japan
Japanese brands
Air pollution control systems